Kimbrough is an unincorporated community in Wilcox County, Alabama, United States, located near Pine Hill on State Route 5.

Geography

References

Unincorporated communities in Alabama
Unincorporated communities in Wilcox County, Alabama